Dale Hollis Hoiberg is a sinologist and has been the editor-in-chief of the Encyclopædia Britannica since 1997. He holds a PhD degree in Chinese literature and began to work for Encyclopædia Britannica as an index editor in 1978. In 2010, Hoiberg co-authored a paper with Harvard researchers Jean-Baptiste Michel and Erez Lieberman Aiden entitled "Quantitative Analysis of Culture Using Millions of Digitized Books". The paper was the first to describe the term culturomics.

References

External links
Hoiberg names some of the new 15-person board's members "some of the smartest people on Earth"
Will Wikipedia Mean the End Of Traditional Encyclopedias?, Jimmy Wales debates Dale Hoiberg (subscription required)

Encyclopædia Britannica
American encyclopedists
American book editors
American sinologists
Year of birth missing (living people)
Living people